is a Japanese chef who works at Sukiyabashi Jiro under his father, Jiro Ono. He was featured in the 2011 film Jiro Dreams of Sushi. He has a younger brother, Takashi, who owns a second establishment in Roppongi Hills.

Personal life 
Yoshikazu is fond of cars, having mentioned his dream of being a Formula 1 driver as a youth. He drives an Audi RS6 Avant.

In 2011, Yoshikazu said that women could not be sushi chefs. He claimed that "the reason is because women menstruate. To be a professional means to have a steady taste in your food, but because of the menstrual cycle, women have an imbalance in their taste, and that’s why women can’t be sushi chefs."

References

Living people
Japanese chefs
Year of birth missing (living people)